The bay-backed shrike (Lanius vittatus) is a member of the bird family Laniidae, the shrikes, resident in South Asia.

Description
It is smallish shrike at 17 cm, maroon-brown above with a pale rump and long black tail with white edges. The underparts are white, but with buff flanks.
The crown and nape are grey, with a typical shrike black bandit mask through the eye. There is a small white wing patch, and the bill and legs are dark grey.

Sexes are similar, but young birds are washed-out versions of the adults.

Habits and habitat
The bay-backed shrike has a characteristic upright "shrike" attitude perched on a bush, from which it sallies after lizards, large insects, small birds and rodents.

Prey may be impaled upon a sharp point, such as a thorn. Thus secured they can be ripped with the strong hooked bill, but its feet are not suited for tearing.

It is a widespread resident breeder in Afghanistan, Pakistan, Nepal and India, and has recently been recorded from Sri Lanka. It nests in bushes in scrubby areas and cultivation, laying 3-5 eggs.

References

 Bay-Backed Shrike -- Bd Environment

External links

bay-backed shrike
Birds of South Asia
Birds of India
Birds of Pakistan
Birds of Afghanistan
bay-backed shrike